Kayla Perrin (possibly born in 1973) is a Jamaican-born Canadian author and actor who has written romance novels, children's books, and suspense novels. "She has received an Arts Acclaim Award for her writing from the city of Brampton, Ontario." Perrin received the Harry Jerome Award for excellence in the arts in 2011. She was featured in the documentary Who's Afraid of Happy Endings.

Selected bibliography
 Heart to Heats (2012)
 Island Love Songs (2013)
 Until Now (2013)
 Playing with Fire (2013)
 What's Done in Darkness (2015)

References

Living people
Year of birth missing (living people)
Canadian romantic fiction writers
Canadian children's writers
Canadian women novelists
Jamaican women writers
Jamaican writers
Jamaican emigrants to Canada
Black Canadian writers
Black Canadian women
Women romantic fiction writers